U.S. Route 10N may refer to:

U.S. Route 10N (Minnesota), a former U.S. Highway in Minnesota
U.S. Route 10N (Montana), a former U.S. Highway in Montana

N
10N
10N